Daniel Zissel Freedman (born 1939 in Hartford, Connecticut) is an American theoretical physicist. He is an Emeritus Professor of Physics and Applied Mathematics at the Massachusetts Institute of Technology (MIT), and is currently a visiting professor at Stanford University. He is mainly known for his work in supergravity. He is a member of the U. S. National Academy of Sciences.

Education
Daniel Freedman completed his undergraduate degree from Wesleyan University and completed his Ph.D. from the University of Wisconsin–Madison in 1964. In 1967–68, Freedman was a member of the School of Natural Sciences at the Institute for Advanced Study, and returned subsequently in 1973–74 and 1986–87. He was appointed Professor of Applied Mathematics at the Massachusetts Institute of Technology (MIT) in 1980 and joint Professor of Physics in 2001. Before joining MIT, he was a professor at Stony Brook University.

Supergravity
In 1976, Daniel Z. Freedman codiscovered (with Sergio Ferrara and Peter van Nieuwenhuizen) supergravity. Freedman and van Nieuwenhuizen were on the faculty of the Stony Brook University. Supergravity generalizes Einstein's theory of general relativity by incorporating the then-new idea of supersymmetry. In the following decades it had implications for physics beyond the Standard Model, for superstring theory and for mathematics. For his work on supergravity, Freedman, a former Sloan and twice Guggenheim fellow, received in 1993 the Dirac Medal and Prize, in 2006 the Dannie Heineman Prize for Mathematical Physics, in 2016 the Majorana Medal and in 2019 the Breakthrough Prize in Fundamental Physics, in each case together with his codiscoverers Sergio Ferrara and Peter van Nieuwenhuizen. Freedman also gave the 2002 Andrejewski Lectures in Mathematical Physics  at the Max Planck Institute for Mathematics in the Sciences in Leipzig.

Research interests
Daniel Freedman is a professor at  MIT. His research is in quantum field theory, quantum gravity, and superstring theory with an emphasis on the role of supersymmetry. His most recent area of concentration is the AdS/CFT correspondence in which results on the strong coupling limit of certain 4-dimensional gauge theories can be obtained from calculations in classical 5-dimensional supergravity.

In the academic year 1993/94 Freedman was a visiting scientist in the CERN Theory Division, Geneva, Switzerland.

References

External links 

 Oral history interview transcript with Daniel Freedman on 26 May 2021, American Institute of Physics, Niels Bohr Library & Archives

1939 births
Living people
21st-century American physicists
Massachusetts Institute of Technology School of Science faculty
Stony Brook University faculty
University of Wisconsin–Madison alumni
Wesleyan University alumni
Theoretical physicists
Institute for Advanced Study visiting scholars
People associated with CERN
MIT Center for Theoretical Physics faculty
Fellows of the American Physical Society
Members of the United States National Academy of Sciences